Indra (Paras Gavaskar) is a superhero appearing in American comic books published by Marvel Comics. A teenage mutant, Indra attended the Xavier Institute before its closing and is a member of the X-Men's training squad.  He first appeared in New X-Men: Academy X #7.

Fictional character biography

Alpha Squadron

Paras Gavaskar is an Indian mutant teenager. After enrolling at the Xavier Institute, Gavaskar was assigned to Alpha Squadron, a training squad mentored by Northstar; he was a top achiever in his classes. Indra and his fellow team members Anole, Loa, Rubbermaid, Network and Kidogo suffered a great loss when they were told that Northstar had been killed in the line of duty. The Alpha Squadron was unaware of Northstar's resurrection. Following the assumed death of Northstar, Karma was their advisor.

M-Day
Following the events of House of M, almost all of the institute's students were depowered, which led to the dissolution of the school's training squads. Indra was one of the only twenty-seven students who didn't lose his mutant abilities.

He participated in Emma Frost's Battle Royale which determined who will train to be an X-Man. Later, forty-two of Indra's former classmates died when their bus was attacked by William Stryker, an anti-mutant crusader.

Quest for Magik
Indra was captured by Belasco and was held in Limbo with most of the other students. When X-23 orchestrated an attempt at escaping, Indra was beaten badly by the demon S'ym when the attack failed.

After returning home, Indra discovers that he is the youngest mutant on the planet, and may become the last mutant on the planet, excluding Franklin Richards, Molly Hayes, Tito Bohusk and (technically) the Stepford Cuckoos, and the most likely to be targeted.

Messiah Complex and Utopia
When Predator X attacks the institute, Surge leaps to the defense of Indra, Trance and Wolf Cub, protecting them from the beast.

Paras later relocates to San Francisco along with all the other X-Men. Soon, the city goes into a state of chaos due to the anti-mutant and pro-mutant movements. Cyclops sends Rogue, Gambit and Danger to find any missing students, Paras being among them. Rogue finds some beaten H.A.M.M.E.R. agents and after absorbing their memories to see if they know where Paras is, it is revealed they attacked him when he was trying to go home to check on his friends. In self-defense, he attacks them and knocks them out.

This act of self-defense causes Paras to have an internal crisis, believing that he violated the most important tenet of his Jain faith—absolute nonviolence. Attempting to access his powers causes him great pain, which Paras believes is divine punishment for betraying his beliefs. Rogue attempts to counsel him, suggesting that his inability to access his powers is psychosomatic. Rogue confronts him with the fact that he chose the codename Indra, the Hindu god of war, despite his pacifist beliefs, and states that she believes he did so out of belief in his own potential. She further states that rather than embrace that potential, he is choosing to back away from it. This causes Paras to lose control, claiming that his Indra form is "not him" before his powers fully remanifest, now as a sophisticated full suit of armor and weaponry.

Collision
Following Second Coming, Rogue and Magneto bring Indra along with fellow students Anole and Loa back to Indra's home in Mumbai to visit his family. Unknown to anyone at the time, Indra's parents planned for him to take his comatose brother's place in an arranged marriage. The X-Men and students visit a local market where strange storms have been placing people, including Indra's brother, in comatose states. During one such storm, the mutants come across a young girl who tells them her name is Luisa and that she's a new mutant with the ability to paint with light. They don't have time to question her before Sentinels arrive to capture her. Anole and Loa manage to finish the Sentinels off, and the X-Men take Luisa back to Indra's family home, where the unruly girl, while flirting with Indra, infuriates his father by creating a light painting of her and Indra in a nude embrace and kissing Indra in his room.

After being questioned by Magneto, Luisa reveals her name is really Luz, she's not a mutant and she is from somewhere called Quitado; a high-tech floating city where she was a student meant to be a part of a device called Angelfire. At that moment, The Children of the Vault attack Indra's family home. Indra is attacked by a member of the Children of the Vault who enters his body and causes him severe physical pain. After Luz gives herself up, the Children of the Vault take Rogue and Magneto back to Quitado. Indra plans on going after them but his father demands he stay and marry instead. Indra then asks for Vaipala to marry him that day to which she agrees so he can go save his friends afterwards. During the ceremony, Vaipala reveals she is actually Luz, having switched places with her during the attack.

Suiting up and disobeying his father and leaving Luz behind because she doesn't want to go; Indra, Loa and Anole go after the Children of the Vault when Luz changes her mind and catches up, together forming a plan. Sneaking into Quitado, Luz hands herself over while Indra, Loa and Anole get away with Rogue, Magento and an unconscious Vaipala. During the escape, Indra attacks Olvido in order to protect Rogue. When she goes to point it out to him, he tells her not to talk about it because he has sinned. Returning home, Indra turns his back on his family and religion because the path of non-violence isn't the way of fighting against evil.

Schism & Regenesis
Indra left Utopia with Wolverine to enroll as a student at the Jean Grey School for Higher Learning.

Powers and abilities

Indra possesses retractable sectional armored plates that he uses to cover himself in protective armor.  His skin is purple and his hair is red-violet; he has a red-violet tilak-like marking on his forehead, though this marking may be cosmetic and not part of his mutation.

Initially, his armor was scaled and plated, similar to a pangolin exoskeleton.  Though he religiously believes in absolute non-violence, he is later forced to act in self-defense and attack a corrupt military officer, resulting in an internal struggle that causes him to lose access to his powers.  When trying to access his armor plating, he experiences great pain and believes this to be a punishment from the Yakshas for his transgression.  After receiving mentoring from Rogue, who believes that Paras chose to name himself after the Hindu god of war for reason, Indra's powers return significantly changed and stronger than before.  His armor takes the form of a full-body, Hindu-stylized suit of armor. He is also able to generate similarly stylized Psionic weaponry, such as swords and daggers, around him out of the air for offensive use.

References

External links

Yearbook Entry on Alpha Squadron

Comics characters introduced in 2004
Marvel Comics characters who have mental powers
Marvel Comics mutants
Marvel Comics superheroes
Marvel Comics male superheroes
Fictional Indian people
Indian superheroes
Characters created by Nunzio DeFilippis
Characters created by Christina Weir